Strohmberg is a mountain of Saxony, southeastern Germany In earlier times there was a Basalt quarry. Strahmberg is 264 metres above sea level and is situated east of Särka/Žarki, close to Kgl.-sächs. Postmeilenstein Särka.

References 

Mountains of Saxony